Leândro Rossi Pereira (born 26 November 1988) is a Brazilian-Polish professional footballer who plays as a forward for Radomiak Radom.

Career

In 2007, Leândro traveled with a Brazilian youth team through a Polish businessman to Poland and Turkey, where they played against Fenerbahçe, one of the most successful clubs in Turkey. After that, however, he stopped playing professional football for 2 years due to not receiving clearance from the Polish Football Association.

Before the second half of the 2010/11 season, he signed for Polish fourth division side Zawisza Rzgów after playing for Mixto in the Brazilian lower leagues.

In early 2012, he signed for Polish fourth division club Radomiak Radom, helping them achieve promotion to the second division within 7 seasons.

Personal life
On 28 June 2021, Leândro received Polish nationality.

Honours

Club
Radomiak Radom
I liga: 2020–21
II liga: 2018–19

References

External links
 
 Leândro Rossi at playmakerstats.com (English version of ogol.com.br)

Brazilian footballers
Living people
Association football forwards
Expatriate footballers in Poland
Naturalized citizens of Poland
III liga players
II liga players
I liga players
Ekstraklasa players
Radomiak Radom players
Brazilian expatriates in Poland
Brazilian expatriate footballers
Footballers from São Paulo (state)
1988 births
People from Andradina